Islam Mahmoud Mohamed El-Sayed El-Shater (born November 16, 1976) is a retired Egyptian footballer.

Honours
Ismaily
 Egyptian Premier League: 2001–02
 Egypt Cup: 2000

Zamalek
 Egyptian Premier League: 2003–04

Al Ahly
 Egyptian Premier League: 2004–05, 2005–06, 2006–07, 2007–08
 Egypt Cup: 2006, 2007
 Egyptian Super Cup: 2005, 2006, 2007
 CAF Champions League: 2005, 2006
 CAF Super Cup: 2006, 2007

Haras El Hodood
 Egypt Cup: 2009, 2009–10
 Egyptian Super Cup: 2009

References

External links

1976 births
Living people
Egyptian footballers
Egypt international footballers
Association football defenders
Zamalek SC players
Ismaily SC players
Al Ahly SC players
Haras El Hodoud SC players
Petrojet SC players
Ittihad FC players
Sportspeople from Alexandria
Egyptian Premier League players
Saudi Professional League players